Ducange is a surname. Notable people with the surname include:

 Charles du Fresne, sieur du Cange (1610–1688), French philologist
 Victor Henri Joseph Brahain Ducange (1783–1833), French writer